Steve Reinhard is an American farmer, teacher, and politician.

Born in Bucyrus, Ohio, Reinhard graduated from Ohio State University with a degree in agriculture education and economics. Reinhard was teacher and farmer. From 2001 to 2008, Reinhard served in the Ohio House of Representatives and is a Republican.

Reinhard taught agriculture at Crestview High School and coached basketball. In 2012, Reinhard served as Crawford County commissioner. He also served on the Ohio Exposition Commission and is the chairman of the commission. In 2016, Reinhard sought election to the Ohio House of Representatives, but was defeated in the primary by Wes Goodman.

With Senator Karen Gillmor resigning from her seat, in 2011, Reinhard was named as a possible successor.

See also

 Ohio House of Representatives

References

1967 births
Living people
Ohio State University College of Food, Agricultural, and Environmental Sciences alumni
People from Bucyrus, Ohio
Educators from Ohio
Farmers from Ohio
County commissioners in Ohio
Republican Party members of the Ohio House of Representatives
21st-century American politicians